HSB may refer to:
 HSB (Sweden), a cooperative housing association
 HSB color space
 HSB Televisión, a Colombian television station
 Bremen University of Applied Sciences
 Hang Seng Bank, a bank based in Hong Kong
 Hardly Strictly Bluegrass, a music festival in San Francisco, California, United States
 Hartford Steam Boiler Inspection and Insurance Company, an American equipment breakdown insurer
 Harz Narrow Gauge Railways, a steam railway in Germany
 Erivan K. Haub School of Business, at Saint Joseph's University in Philadelphia, Pennsylvania, United States
 "Heart-Shaped Box", a Nirvana song
 Heaven Shall Burn, a German extreme metal band
 Helensburgh railway station, in Australia
 Helgeland Sparebank, a Norwegian bank
 Helsby railway station, in England
 Hill Street Blues, a serial police drama
 Humidity Sounder for Brazil, an instrument on the Aqua satellite
 Hunter-Schreger band, a feature of the tooth enamel in mammals
 Upper Sorbian language (ISO 639-2 language code)
 Head Start Bureau, a United States federal government agency which runs the Head Start program
 Hogslop String Band, a bluegrass string group